Patrick Somerville (born April 14, 1979) is an American novelist and television writer living in Chicago, Illinois, United States.

Career

Novels
Somerville graduated from Cornell University in 2005. He published his debut novel, The Cradle, in 2009 and his second novel This Bright River in 2012.

Television
In 2013, Somerville joined the writing staff of The Bridge, where he wrote two episodes of the series.  From 2015 to 2017, he was a writer on the HBO series The Leftovers.   In October 2016, it was announced that Somerville would write the Netflix series Maniac. In December 2017, he signed a deal to develop new TV and digital projects exclusively for Paramount Television (now Paramount Television Studios). In October 2019, it was announced that he would be the writer and showrunner for a 10 episode HBO Max miniseries Station Eleven. He was also the showrunner for the first season of the series Made for Love.

In April 2022, it was announced that Somerville and Emily St. John Mandel would adapt The Glass Hotel and Sea of Tranquility as two Station Eleven followup series for HBO Max.

Film
Somerville is set to write and produce an original script, Ursa Major, directed by Jonathan and Josh Baker for XYZ Films. Mary Elizabeth Winstead and Xochitl Gomez are attached to star in the film.

Publications

Novels
 The Cradle (2009)
 This Bright River (2012)

Short story collections
 Trouble: Stories (2006)
 The Universe in Miniature in Miniature (2010)

Filmography

References

External links
 

21st-century American novelists
Living people
Writers from Chicago
American television writers
American male television writers
Cornell University alumni
American male novelists
American male screenwriters
1979 births
21st-century American male writers
Novelists from Illinois
Screenwriters from Illinois
21st-century American screenwriters